Ground pounder may refer to:
Walking
A slang term for infantry soldiers